Petropavlovsk-Kamchatsky is a city and the administrative, industrial, scientific, and cultural center of Kamchatka Krai, Russia. As of the 2021 Census its population is 164,900.

The city is widely known simply as Petropavlovsk (literally "city of Peter and Paul"). The adjective Kamchatsky ("Kamchatkan") was added to the official name in 1924.

Geography
The city is situated on high hills and surrounded by volcanoes. The surrounding terrain is mountainous enough that the horizon cannot be seen clearly from any point in town. Across Avacha Bay from the city in Vilyuchinsk is Russia's largest submarine base, the Rybachiy Nuclear Submarine Base, established during the Soviet period and still used by the Russian Navy.

History

Cossack units visited the area from 1697. The explorer and navigator Captain Vitus Bering (a Dane in the service of the Imperial Russian Navy) is considered to have founded the city in 1740, although navigator  had laid the foundation a few months earlier. Bering reached Avacha Bay in late 1740 and in his capacity as the superior officer, named the new settlement "Petropavlovsk" (Peter and Paul) after his two ships, the Saint Peter and the Saint Paul, which had been built in Okhotsk for his second expedition (1733–42). The town's location on the eastern coast of the Kamchatka Peninsula, on the sheltered Avacha Bay and at the mouth of the Avacha River, saw it develop to become the most important settlement in Kamchatka. It gained town status on 9 April 1812.

During the 1853–55 Crimean War, Anglo-French forces put the city under siege (August–September 1854), but it never fell. After much exchange of fire, six hundred Anglo-French troops landed south of the city; two hundred and thirty Russian troops forced them to retreat after heavy fighting (1 September 1854). Four days later, a larger force of nine hundred Anglo-French troops landed east of the town, but again the Russians repelled the allies (5 September 1854). The allied ships then retreated from Russian Pacific waters (7 September 1854). The total Russian losses were reported  at around a hundred men; the Anglo-French were said to have lost 209 men, over twice that number.

At the time of the surrender of Japan in World War II (August/September 1945), United States Naval Construction Battalion 114 was in the Aleutians. In September 1945 the battalion received orders to send a detachment to the USSR to build a Naval Advance Base (a Fleet Weather Central) – located ten miles outside Petropavlovsk-Kamchatsky and  code-named TAMA. The original agreement gave the Seabees three weeks to complete the camp. Upon arrival the Soviets told the Seabees they had ten days, and were amazed that the Seabees achieved the task. It was one of two to which Stalin agreed. The other was near Khabarovsk, in buildings provided by the Russians.  For mail Petropavlovsk was assigned Navy number 1169, FPO San Francisco. The American use of these two bases proved short-lived.

Petropavlovsk was a great source of fish, particularly salmon, and crab meat for the Soviet Union in the 20th century. Following the end of the Soviet era in December 1991, fishing rights have also been granted to foreign interests. Poaching of salmon for their caviar at Petropavlovsk-Kamchatskiy remains a problem amid lax law-enforcement and widespread corruption.

Administrative and municipal status
Petropavlovsk-Kamchatsky is the administrative center of the krai. Within the framework of administrative divisions, it is incorporated as Petropavlovsk-Kamchatsky City Under Krai Jurisdiction — an administrative unit with status equal to that of the districts. As a municipal division, Petropavlovsk-Kamchatsky City Under Krai Jurisdiction is incorporated as Petropavlovsk-Kamchatsky Urban Okrug.

Culture

Sports
The main association football stadium in Petropavlovsk-Kamchatskiy is the 5,000-capacity Spartak Stadium. The former club FC Volcano played at the stadium.

Tourism
The city has developed a tourist infrastructure. About twenty large tourism companies offer a wide range of services from bear hunting to paragliding.

Transport
The city is served by Petropavlovsk-Kamchatsky (Elizovo) Airport, which is linked to the town and its port via the A-401 road. During the warmer months cruise ships regularly stop there for the day.

Demographics

Ethnic Russians make up the majority of the population; the city on its own has more inhabitants than the entire neighboring Chukotka Autonomous Okrug or Magadan Oblast.

The population numbered 179,780 in 2010; 179,800 in 2011; 179,784 in 2012; and 181,618 in 2013.

Ethnic composition (2010):
 Russians – 89.7%
 Ukrainians – 4.1%
 Tatars – 0.8%
 Belarusians – 0.7%
 Others – 4.7%

Climate
The climate at Petropavlovsk-Kamchatskiy reasonably qualifies as a subpolar climate (Köppen Dfc). However, this area's climate has strong oceanic influences due its proximity to the Pacific ocean. Average monthly precipitation is highest in autumn, with October the wettest month on average, closely followed by November. May through July are markedly the driest months on average; June is the single driest month. Winter temperatures are much milder than in Siberia. Thus, resulting from oceanic cooling, summer daytime high temperatures in Petropavlovsk-Kamchatskiy are markedly cooler than in interior Siberia. In warmer-summer years, monthly high averages in July–August can reach  and higher. Days of above  can be expected an average of 19.6 days per summer.

Despite the generally high precipitation, the weather is less cloudy than in the adjacent Kuril Islands that are one of the least sunny places in the world, since the city is located behind a peninsula to the north that blocks some of the fog from the cold Oyashio Current offshore of the Kamchatka Peninsula. Oceanic water in Avacha Bay and adjacent bays is also warmer than coastal waters of Kuril Islands and Okhotsk sea coast (except Southern Kuriles and Southern Sakhalin).

In the spring (February to April), seawater may freeze.

Highest Temperature:  on July 2, 2012

Lowest Temperature:  on February 14, 1917

Highest Daily Precipitation:  on November 10, 2002

Wettest Year:  in 1971

Driest Year:  in 1947

Politics

Results of the Russian legislative elections

Twin towns – sister cities

Petropavlovsk-Kamchatskiy is twinned with:
 Kushiro, Japan (since 1998)
Unalaska, Alaska (since 1990)

Notable residents
Pavlo Ishchenko, Ukrainian-Israeli Olympic boxer
Anatolii Mohyliov, Ukrainian politician
Sergei Ursuliak, Russian filmmaker, screenwriter and actor, and TV presenter
Elena Yakovishina, Russian Olympic skier
Igor Smirnov, 1st president of Pridnestrovian Moldavian Soviet Socialist Republic and Transnistria
Regina Sych, Russian swimmer
Innokenty Omulevsky, Russian writer
Aleksandra Frantseva, Russian alpine skier
Viktor Borel, a Belarusian football coach and former player
Artem Ansheles, a  Hong Kong actor

References

Sources

External links

Official website of Petropavlovsk-Kamchatskiy 
New photos of the city 
Petropavlovsk-Kamchatskiy Internet portal 
History of the city of Petropavlovsk-Kamchatskiy

See also 
Bechevinka, Soviet naval base known by the codename Petropavlovsk-Kamchatsky-54

Cities and towns in Kamchatka Krai
Ports and harbours of the Russian Pacific Coast
Port cities and towns in Russia
Populated coastal places in Russia
Russian Far East
Russian and Soviet Navy bases
Russian and Soviet Navy submarine bases
Populated places established in 1740
1740s establishments in the Russian Empire
Road-inaccessible communities of Russia